Discipline is the only solo album recorded by American songwriter and producer Desmond Child. It was released on Elektra in 1991 and features his longer take on "Love on a Rooftop", a song he wrote for Ronnie Spector's album Unfinished Business in 1987, later included in Cher's studio album Heart of Stone. Child's version reached number 40 on the US Billboard Hot 100. Bon Jovi guitarist Richie Sambora appears on the album; he co-wrote two tracks ("Discipline" and "According to the Gospel of Love"). Also notable is an appearance by Bon Jovi's drummer, Tico Torres. Songwriter Burt Bacharach co-wrote the song "Obsession", which peaked at number 19 on the Billboard Adult Contemporary chart.

Track listing
"The Price of Lovin' You" (Child) – 3:51
"Discipline" (Child, Richie Sambora) – 5:07
"I Don't Wanna Be Your Friend" (Diane Warren) – 4:59
"Love on a Rooftop" (Child, Warren) – 5:19
"You're the Story of My Life" (Child, Warren) – 4:59
"According to the Gospel of Love" (Child, Sambora) – 6:10
"Do Me Right" (Child) – 4:20
"Obsession" (featuring Maria Vidal) (Child, Burt Bacharach) – 5:47
"The Gift of Life" (Child) – 7:10
"A Ray of Hope" (Don Paul Yowell) – 4:56

Personnel

Musicians
Desmond Child – lead vocals
Joan Jett, Mark Free, Jesse Harte, Mitch Malloy, Kane Roberts, Rouge (Maria Vidal, Diana Grasselli, Myriam Valle) – backing vocals
Vivian Campbell, Butch Walker, John McCurry, Steve Lukather, Richie Sambora – guitars
Jeffrey "C.J." Vanston – keyboards, synthesizers
Tony Levin, Abraham Laboriel – bass
Vinnie Colaiuta, Tico Torres – drums
Michael Fisher – percussion

Production
Arranged by Desmond Child and Jeffrey "C.J." Vanston
Produced by Desmond Child and Sir Arthur Payson
Recorded and engineered by Sir Arthur Payson
Mixed by Brian Malouf; mix assistant: Pat MacDougall
Mastered by Bob Ludwig

References

External links
Discipline at Discogs
List of performers on the record

1991 debut albums
Elektra Records albums
Albums produced by Desmond Child